Vakula may refer to:

 Vakula (surname)
 Vakula the Smith, opera by Pyotr Ilyich Tchaikovsky
 Vakula Devi, Hindu goddess
 Vakula Mahadevi, queen regnant in 10th-century India

See also